Vindeln is a locality and the seat of Vindeln Municipality in Västerbotten County, Sweden with 2,333 inhabitants in 2010.

Climate 
Vindeln has a subarctic climate that is mildened for its latitude by its proximity to the Gulf Stream airflow. Considering it being inland, winters are more severe than coastal areas such as Umeå and Holmön, but milder than areas at a higher elevation. Summers are short but often warm, with civil twilight lasting all night during a few weeks, contrasted by the vast winter darkness with very short days. Precipitation is moderate but due to the cold winter temperatures there is a sizeable snow cover every year.

References 

Populated places in Västerbotten County
Populated places in Vindeln Municipality
Municipal seats of Västerbotten County
Swedish municipal seats